The 2012 Mosconi Cup, the 19th edition of the annual nine-ball pool competition between teams representing Europe and the United States, took place 10–13 December 2012 at the York Hall in Bethnal Green, London, England.

Team Europe won the Mosconi Cup by defeating Team USA 11–9.


Teams

Results

Monday, 10 December

Tuesday, 11 December

Wednesday, 12 December

Thursday, 13 December

References

External links
 Official homepage

2012
2012 in cue sports
2012 in English sport
Sport in the London Borough of Tower Hamlets
2012 sports events in London
December 2012 sports events in the United Kingdom